Marigaux, also known as SML (Strasser-Marigaux-Lemaire) is a French manufacturer of high quality woodwind musical instruments.

Marigaux is considered one of the world's best oboe-makers. The company has made a line of woodwinds that has also included clarinets, saxophones, flutes and bassoons.

History 
Strasser Marigaux & Lemaire was founded January 12, 1935 by three partners: Charles Strasser, a businessman who was born in Switzerland; Jules Marigaux, an instrument maker who trained at Buffet-Crampon, where his father was "premier ouvrier," and Lemaire. After the death of Lemaire many years ago, Strasser and Marigaux bought their partner's shares and the company became known as "Strasser-Marigaux." Marigaux died in the early 1970s, leaving Strasser the sole owner of the company. Strasser then sold SML (it continues to use these initials) to a holding company—Strasser-Marigaux S.A..

Strasser Marigaux began its activity in Paris with manufacture of saxophones and flutes. Production of oboes and clarinets was started in a workshop located in la Couture-Boussey, in the Eure department, cradle of French artisan manufacture.

SML ceased production of saxophones in 1982; at the time, the company was making 400 saxes a year. It was also selling saxes to King Musical Instruments, which marketed them under the name,"King Marigaux." A company spokesperson said SML stopped making saxophones because "we just couldn't compete with Selmer anymore" and would "... devote itself entirely to the improvement of the oboe and the clarinet".

External links 

  - credit for the information in this article.
  - this site is carrying the SML torch nowadays.
 Company website

Musical instrument manufacturing companies based in Paris
Oboe manufacturing companies
Clarinet manufacturing companies
Manufacturing companies established in 1935
French companies established in 1935
French brands